Héctor Ruiz Cadenas (born 27 April 1983) is a Spanish tennis player.

Ruiz has a career high ATP singles ranking of 205 achieved on 9 July 2007. He also has a career high doubles ranking of 394 achieved on 9 October 2006.

He won his only ATP Challenger doubles title at the 2006 Iskratel Open in Kranj.

ATP Challenger and ITF Futures finals

Singles: 9 (3–6)

Doubles: 8 (2–6)

References

External links
 
 

1983 births
Living people
Spanish male tennis players